Intuition Peak is a sharp Antarctic peak of elevation 780 m in Levski Ridge, Tangra Mountains on Livingston Island in the South Shetland Islands, Antarctica. It is surmounting Iskar Glacier to the east and Devnya Valley to the west. The peak was named in appreciation of the role of scientific intuition for the advancement of human knowledge.

Location

Maps
 L. L. Ivanov et al. Antarctica: Livingston Island and Greenwich Island, South Shetland Islands. Scale 1:100000 topographic map. Sofia: Antarctic Place-names Commission of Bulgaria, 2005.
 L. L. Ivanov. Antarctica: Livingston Island and Greenwich, Robert, Snow and Smith Islands. Scale 1:120000 topographic map. Troyan: Manfred Wörner Foundation, 2009. 
 Antarctic Digital Database (ADD). Scale 1:250000 topographic map of Antarctica. Scientific Committee on Antarctic Research (SCAR). Since 1993, regularly upgraded and updated.
 L.L. Ivanov. Antarctica: Livingston Island and Smith Island. Scale 1:100000 topographic map. Manfred Wörner Foundation, 2017.

References
 Intuition Peak. SCAR Composite Antarctic Gazetteer
 Bulgarian Antarctic Gazetteer. Antarctic Place-names Commission. (details in Bulgarian, basic data in English)

External links
 Intuition Peak. Copernix satellite image

Tangra Mountains